David Baillie (6 June 1905 – November 1967) was an English footballer who played as a goalkeeper for Coryton, West Ham United and Chester City.

Career
Baillie started his career with Coryton before signing for West Ham in 1925. He remained with West Ham for six seasons but made only 17 appearances in all competitions and was mainly used as an understudy to first choice keeper, Ted Hufton.
He moved to Chester in 1929 under the managership of Charlie Hewitt and, at the end of his footballing career, returned to Upton Park where he took up the post of assistant groundsman.

Baillie died in 1967.

References

1905 births
1967 deaths
English footballers
Association football goalkeepers
West Ham United F.C. players
Chester City F.C. players
English Football League players
West Ham United F.C. non-playing staff